Saint Joseph School is a private, Catholic school located on Gould Street in Wakefield, Massachusetts. It serves students from preschool to 8th grade.

The two-story Neo-Gothic Revival brick school building was designed by Maginnis & Walsh and was built in 1924. It was added to the National Register of Historic Places in 1989 as a locally rare example of Gothic Revival architecture.  The parish for which it was built was established in 1850; the school began with a single grade and was gradually expanded to eight, taught by the Sisters of Saint Joseph.

See also
National Register of Historic Places listings in Wakefield, Massachusetts
National Register of Historic Places listings in Middlesex County, Massachusetts

References

External links
Official School Website

School buildings on the National Register of Historic Places in Massachusetts
Gothic Revival architecture in Massachusetts
1925 establishments in Massachusetts
Educational institutions established in 1925
Private middle schools in Massachusetts
Roman Catholic Archdiocese of Boston
National Register of Historic Places in Wakefield, Massachusetts
Private K–8 schools in the United States